DCDB may refer to:
 Digital Cadastral DataBase
 Direct Current Distribution Board
 Dickenson County Discussion Board